Mercurialis annua is a species of flowering plant in the spurge family Euphorbiaceae known by the common name annual mercury or (rarely) French mercury. It is native to Europe, North Africa, and the Middle East but it is known on many other continents as an introduced species.

Description 
This is an annual herb growing 10 to 70 centimeters tall with oppositely arranged, stipulate oval leaves each a few centimeters long. The male flowers are borne in spikelike clusters sprouting from leaf axils, and female flowers grow at leaf axils in clusters of 2 or 3. The fruit is a bristly schizocarp 2 or 3 millimeters wide containing shiny, pitted seeds.

The species is monoecious or androdioecious.

A plant of Mercurialis annua can produce up to 135 million pollen grains.

Phytochemistry 
Isorhamnetin-3-rutinoside-4′-glucoside, rutin, narcissin (Isorhamnetin 3-rutinoside), quercetin-3-(2G-glucosyl)-rutinoside and isorhamnetin-3-rutinoside-7-glucoside can be isolated from the methanolic extract of M. annua. Historically, the First Nations people of eastern Canada used the juices of the plant as a balm for wounds.

Distribution and habitat 
Mercurialis annua grows in many types of open habitat, including disturbed areas, from sea level to 1400 m.

References

External links 

 USDA Plants Profile
 
 
 

Acalypheae
Dioecious plants
Flora of Europe
Flora of North Africa
Flora of Western Asia
Plants described in 1753
Taxa named by Carl Linnaeus